Chionarctia is a genus of tiger moths in the family Erebidae erected by Nobutoyo Kôda in 1859. The moths in the genus are found in east Asia.

Species
Chionarctia nivea (Ménétriés, 1859)
Chionarctia pura (Leech, 1899)

References

 , 1990: New taxa of tiger moths (Lepidoptera, Arctiidae: Arctiinae) from the Palearctic. 2-nd report. In: Taxonomy of insects and helminths: 89-101, Nauka, Siberian Department: Novosibirsk. (Series “New and little known species of Siberian fauna”, No. 22) (in Russian).
 , 1988: A Generic Classification of the Subfamily Arctiinae of the Palaearctic and Oriental Regions based on the Male and Female Genitalia (Lepidoptera, Arctiidae). Part II. Tyô to Ga 39 (1): 1-79, Tokyo.

External links

Spilosomina
Moth genera